The Heroic Monsieur Boniface (French: L'Héroïque Monsieur Boniface) is a 1949 French comedy film directed by Maurice Labro and starring Fernandel, Andrex, Gaston Orbal and Liliane Bert. It was shot at the Photosonor Studios in Paris. The film's sets were designed by the art director Jacques Colombier. It was followed by a 1951 sequel The Sleepwalker.

Synopsis
Boniface, a shy window dresser, finds himself caught up in a murder case, and decides to tackle the gang leader behind the killing. They in turn kidnaps Boniface's girlfriend Irene.

Cast
 Fernandel as Boniface
 Andrex as Charlie
 Gaston Orbal as M. Simon 
 Charles Bouillaud as Le troisième gangster	
 Palmyre Levasseur as La logeuse
 Julien Maffre as Le lampiste 
 Albert Malbert as Le bistrot 
 Max Révol as Le chef de gare
 Francis Salabert as 	Le commissaire
 Michel Ardan as 	Le deuxième gangster
 Yves Deniaud as 	Le premier gangster
 Liliane Bert as Irène

References

Bibliography 
 Rège, Philippe . Encyclopedia of French Film Directors, Volume 1. Scarecrow Press, 2009.

External links 
 

1949 films
French comedy films
1949 comedy films
1940s French-language films
Films directed by Maurice Labro
1940s French films